Narasimha Nakha Stuti (also popularly Nakha Stuti), is one of the most famous and short Stutis (poems) composed by Sri Madhvacharya in praise of nails of Lord Narasimha written in Sragdhara metre. Stuti means eulogy, singing praise, panegyric and to praise the virtues, deeds and nature of God by realising them in our hearts. In this stuti Madhvacharya eulogised the power of lord Narasimha and his nails. Indologist B. N. K. Sharma says, "According to tradition, Madhva composed these two verses and had them prefixed to his disciple's Vayu Stuti, extolling Madhva in his three 'incarnations', as he did not approve of the disciple's praising him, exclusively. They are now recited as part of the Vayu Stuti, at the beginning and at the end".

References

Bibliography

 

Dvaita Vedanta
Vaishnava texts
Hindu devotional texts
Hindu texts
Sanskrit texts
Hymns